The Volta Glacier is located in Mount Aspiring National Park in the Southern Alps of the South Island of New Zealand.

It is split into upper and lower glaciers which are connected by an icefall. The Lower Volta Glacier feeds an unnamed lake at the Glacier Toe, which in turn feeds the Waiatoto River which eventually runs out to the West Coast.

References

Glaciers of New Zealand
Landforms of the West Coast, New Zealand
Mount Aspiring National Park